The 1996 IIHF Asian Oceanic Junior U18 Championship was the 13th edition of the IIHF Asian Oceanic Junior U18 Championship. It took place between 19 and 22 March 1996 in Ust-Kamenogorsk, Kazakhstan. The tournament was won by Kazakhstan, who claimed their third title by finishing first in the standings. South Korea and Japan finished second and third respectively.

Standings

Fixtures
Reference

References

External links
International Ice Hockey Federation

IIHF Asian Oceanic U18 Championships
Asian
International ice hockey competitions hosted by Kazakhstan